Power, in comics, may refer to:
Power Comics, a British comics publisher
Power Comics (Eclipse Comics), an Eclipse Comics title that reprinted Powerman stories
The Power family in Marvel Comics, connected with Power Pack:
James Power (comics), the father
Margaret Power, the mother
Alex Power
Julie Power
Jack Power (Marvel Comics)
Katie Power
Josiah Power, a DC Comics character
Powers (comics), an Icon Comics series from Brian Michael Bendis

It may also refer to:
Brother Power the Geek, a DC Comics character
Power Boy, a number of DC Comics superheroes
Power Company, a DC Comics team
Power Girl, a DC Comics superheroine
Power Man, a number of Marvel Comics characters
Power Princess, a Marvel Comics character
Power ring (DC Comics), a DC Comics weapon used by the Green Lanterns (and later connected Corps)
Power Ring (DC supervillains), a number of DC Comics supervillains
Power Surge (comics), a DC Comics storyline
Supreme Power, a Marvel Comics fictional universe
Ultimate Power, a Marvel Comics series that tied the Ultimate Marvel universe with the Supreme Power one
Will to Power (comics), a Dark Horse Comics storyline

See also
Power (disambiguation)

References